Kegalle is a large town in Sabaragamuwa Province of Sri Lanka. It is the main town in the Kegalle District, which is one of two districts which comprise Sabaragamuwa Province. The town is governed by an Urban Council.

Kegalle has an agricultural based economy and mainly produces rubber. The surrounding area produces graphite, precious stones and agricultural products such as rice.

History 

The history of the area dates back to the stone age of Sri Lanka. According to evidence there had been a prosperous civilisation in Kegalle prior to 28,000 years. The caves of Beli lena, Dorawaka lena, Alu lena, Asmadala, Padavigampola, Batalegala, Lenagala, Ambala Kanda, Halamada, Heenatipana, Uthuwankanda, Beligala, Salawa, Yahalena, Salgala and Kela Dambulla provide evidence of that.

According to the archaeology of the Kegalle District, it has been a region in Maya Rata, which was one of three divisions of Sri Lanka. In the latter half of the Sinhalese kingdom and also by the ruling period of the British, Kegalle was further divided into three parts; “Satara Koralaya”,” Thun Koralaya” and “Patha Bulathgama”.

Physical information 

Kegalle, situated in between the central highlands and western southern planes and has an enchanting environment. Rubber cultivation has stretched over most of the area of the district and minor export crops such as coffee, cocoa, pepper, clove and nutmeg takes an important place in the district's economy. Sri Lanka’s oldest graphite mine is situated at Bogala in Kegalle District.

Economy 

The land has become another fertile facilitator to the cultivation promoted needs of the citizens of Kegalle. The district mainly being an agrarian society, rubber, tea and coconut are cultivated as the main crops of it. Apart from that clove, pepper, coffee and cocoa too are being cultivated as secondary commodities. As of the rubber cultivation, 33% of the agrarian lands have been utilised for it.  of land area have been occupied for the paddy cultivation. The rain water is the main resource provider for the cultivation in Kegalle.

Minerals are another lucrative donor of the district of Kegalle. The Bogala graphite is one of the most notable mine in Kegalle district and marks a half amount of the total mineral export of Sri Lanka. The gem distribution near the Kelani River further boosts for the economic prosperity of the district.

Education

Secondary 
The town has a number of schools including:
 Aranayake Central College (M.M.V.), Ussapitiya
 Baduriya Central College, Mawanella
 Bandaranayake Maha Vidyalaya, Hettimulla
 Dippitiya Muslim Maha Vidyalaya,
 Dehiowita M.V.
 Dharul Uloom Muslim Maha Vidyalaya, Rambukkana
 Dudley Senanayaka Central College (M.M.V.), Tholangamuwa
 Hathgampala Maha Vidyalaya, Aranayaka
 Kegalu Vidyalaya
 Kegalu Balika Vidyalaya
 Mayurapaada M.M.V., Mawanella
 Molagoda Jayapala Maha Vidyalaya
 Parakumba Maha Vidyalaya , Dedigama
 Pinnawala Central College (M.M.V.), Rambukkana
 Rajasinghe Central College (M.M.V.), Ruwanwella
 Royal College - Kegalle (formerly known as Walagamaba Kanishta Vidyalaya)
 Sirisaman M.M.V., Deraniyagala
 St. Joseph Balika Vidyalaya - Kegalle (formerly known as St. Joseph's Convent)
 St. Mary's College
 St. Mary's Maha Vidyalaya
 Swarna Jayanthi Vidyalaya
 Sulaimaniya Navodya School, Kannattota
 Thalgaspitiya Muslim Maha Vidyalaya, Aranayake
 Walagama Maha Vidyalaya, Dewalegama
 Yatiyantota M.M.V.
 Zahira College Mawanella (Muslim M.M.V.)

Higher Education Institutes
 Advanced Technological Institute
 National Apprentice and Industrial Training Authority
 Open University of Sri Lanka - Study Centre
 Technical College, Kegalle 
 SANASA Campus

Attractions

Pinnawala Elephant Orphanage 

Pinnawala Elephant Orphanage is an orphanage, nursery and captive breeding ground for wild Asian elephants located at Pinnawala village, 13 km (8.1 mi) northeast of Kegalle town in Sabaragamuwa Province of Sri Lanka. Pinnawala is notable for having the largest herd of captive elephants in the world.

Asupini Ella
Asupini Ella (waterfall) also called 'Asupini Falls' is a  waterfall that can be seen from the historic town of Aranayake. According to ancient tales, it was named after the story about a King who had many queens. On his return from war, he assured them that he would give them a sign from the hills about the fate of the war. He said, “If his soldiers waved a white flag over the hills, it would mean he was defeated and killed in action. But, if he waved his own flag bearing his crest, that he was victorious". The King decided to play a joke on his wives, who were waiting with their horses near the waterfall to see the visual message, by waving a white flag. His wives were so upset that they all committed suicide by jumping over the falls which inspired the name Ahupini, which is derived from 'Aswaya' (Horse) and 'Pini' or 'Panina' (Jump) which combined means "the horses jumped over the falls".

Buddhist Temples 
Wewaladeniya Viharaya, also known as Kegalla Siri Mahindodaya Piriwen Viharaya is one of oldest temples in Kegalle. It is located at the centre of the town.

Other 
Alagalla Mountain Range in Sabaragamuwa province is "Freedom Summit" in Sri Lanka, where an annual folk climbing event takes place on 4 February commemorating country's independent from British empire.

Notable people from Kegalle

 Chinthaka Jayawickrama -  Sri Lankan cricketer
 The Honourable Dr. P. B. G. Kalugalla - Member of Sri Lanka Parliament from Kegalle District for 26 years until 2000. He was the Sri Lankan High Commissioner to Canada and Ambassador to Philippines
 Sir Edwin Wijeyeratne - First elected member of Kegalle to State Council of Ceylon, Sri Lankan independence activist & Cabinet Minister of Home Affairs and Rural Development in the government of D. S. Senanayake.

Demographics 
Kegalle is a Sinhalese majority town; there are sizable communities belonging to other ethnic groups, such as Indian Tamils, Muslims and Tamils. Others include Burgher and Malay. 
Source:2012 statistics.gov.lk

See also
Kegalle District
Wanduradeniya
Pinnawala Elephant Orphanage
Alagalla Mountain Range
Kegalu Vidyalaya

References

External links 

 
Populated places in Sabaragamuwa Province
Populated places in Kegalle District